Catawba is a town in Price County, Wisconsin, United States. The population was 283 at the 2000 census. The Village of Catawba is located within the town.

Geography
According to the United States Census Bureau, the town has a total area of 50.0 square miles (129.5 km2), of which, 50.0 square miles (129.4 km2) of it is land and 0.04 square miles (0.1 km2) of it (0.04%) is water.

Demographics
As of the census of 2000, there were 283 people, 109 households, and 75 families residing in the town. The population density was 5.7 people per square mile (2.2/km2). There were 162 housing units at an average density of 3.2 per square mile (1.3/km2). The racial makeup of the town was 98.59% White, 0.35% Black or African American, 0.35% Native American, 0.35% Pacific Islander, and 0.35% from two or more races. 0.35% of the population were Hispanic or Latino of any race. 48.9% were of German, 10.3% Polish, 9.4% Norwegian, 7.3% Dutch, 5.6% American and 5.2% Czech ancestry.

There were 109 households, out of which 32.1% had children under the age of 18 living with them, 57.8% were married couples living together, 3.7% had a female householder with no husband present, and 30.3% were non-families. 28.4% of all households were made up of individuals, and 9.2% had someone living alone who was 65 years of age or older. The average household size was 2.60 and the average family size was 3.14.

In the town, the population was spread out, with 29.0% under the age of 18, 4.6% from 18 to 24, 31.1% from 25 to 44, 22.3% from 45 to 64, and 13.1% who were 65 years of age or older. The median age was 36 years. For every 100 females, there were 109.6 males. For every 100 females age 18 and over, there were 109.4 males.

The median income for a household in the town was $33,571, and the median income for a family was $35,938. Males had a median income of $33,750 versus $18,906 for females. The per capita income for the town was $14,235. About 1.3% of families and 4.5% of the population were below the poverty line, including 4.8% of those under the age of 18 and 10.0% of those 65 or over.

References

Towns in Price County, Wisconsin
Towns in Wisconsin